Alena Kašová (born 6 March 1960) is a Slovak basketball player who competed for Czechoslovakia in the women's tournament at the 1988 Summer Olympics.

References

External links
 
 

1960 births
Living people
Slovak women's basketball players
Olympic basketball players of Czechoslovakia
Basketball players at the 1988 Summer Olympics
Sportspeople from Nitra